Mycerinodes is a genus of longhorn beetles of the subfamily Lamiinae, containing the following species:

 Mycerinodes lettowvorbecki Kriesche, 1926
 Mycerinodes puerilis Kolbe, 1894
 Mycerinodes uluguruensis Breuning, 1975

References

Morimopsini